Founded in 1891, Livermore Union High School is a public high school located in the city of Livermore, California, United States. It is part of the Livermore Valley Joint Unified School District. In 2007, it was chosen as one in four schools in Alameda County to receive the California Distinguished School award.

Academics
Livermore High School is home to the LHS Green Engineering Academy, a program to promote engineering through hands-on learning activities and applications of engineering to all areas of the students academics. GEA is open to 60 students per year. In October 2012, GEA won the Golden Bell Award for outstanding academic programs in a California classroom. The GEA gained further success and publicity through students' audits of Bay Area schools, being featured on ABC 7 News, CBS 5 News, and KQED 88.5 FM radio, The Alameda County Office of Education and PG&E.

Advanced Placement courses offered include English Language and Composition, English Literature and Composition, French Language, Spanish Language, Studio Art (2-D, 3-D, and Drawing), Psychology, Chemistry, Calculus AB and BC, Macroeconomics, Microeconomics, Biology, United States History, World History, and Computer Science.

Livermore High School is also a member of the Tri-Valley Regional Occupation Program (ROP), hosting numerous ROP classes such as Auto Body, Environmental Science, Criminal Justice, Developmental Psychology of Children, and Marketing.

Athletics
Under Livermore cross country coach Ed Salazar, the cross country team set a NCS record with seven straight section titles from 1990-1996. During this period Micheil Jones (1994) and Joe Smith (1995) won individual state cross country titles.

The Livermore lacrosse team was created in 2006. At the end of the 2008 season, four team members were named East Bay Athletic League Honorable Mention players.

Campus 
A new 49,000-square foot gymnasium facility was completed in June 2022. The building contains a main gym, wrestling room, and dance studio. Construction was completed ahead of schedule due to distance learning during the COVID-19 pandemic.

A new aquatics facility is under construction.

LHS PTSA
The Livermore High School PTSA, or parent-teacher association, was chartered in 2011. It's website is here. The group's purpose is to support staff, academics, and student life at LHS.

Notable alumni
Mikkel Aaland: photographer
Troy Dayak: professional soccer player with the San Jose Earthquakes
 Delbert Gee: Alameda County Superior Court Judge
 Duane Glinton: professional soccer player
 Gavin Glinton: professional soccer player
 J. R. Graham: professional baseball player
 Randy Johnson (Class of 1982), Major League Baseball pitcher (1988–2009) for Montreal Expos, Seattle Mariners, Houston Astros, Arizona Diamondbacks, New York Yankees, and San Francisco Giants; inducted into the Baseball Hall of Fame on July 26, 2015
Danny Payne: professional soccer player
 Bryan Shaw (Class of 2005): Major League Baseball pitcher (2011–present) for Arizona Diamondbacks, Cleveland Indians, and Colorado Rockies
Alfredo Véa Jr.: lawyer and novelist.
Alex Trudeau Viriato: Emmy Award Winning Film Producer

References

External links
 Livermore High School website
 Livermore High School PTSA
 Livermore Valley Joint Unified School District website

High schools in Alameda County, California
Educational institutions established in 1891
Livermore, California
Public high schools in California
1891 establishments in California